Rassvet or Рассвет is a Russian language word that means "sunrise" or "dawn". It may also refer to:
Rassvet, Moldova, a village administered by the town of Bucovăţ, Moldova
Rassvet, Russia, name of several rural localities in Russia
Rassvet (ISS module)
Rassvet, a communication system on the Soyuz spacecraft
Rassvet, the nineteenth episode of Season 6 of the TV Show "The Blacklist".